Nagandla (Village ID 590735) is a Panchayat Village in Inkollu Mandal of Prakasam district, Andhra Pradesh. Its pin code is 523190. The badminton player Pullela Gopichand was born in this village. According to the 2011 census it has a population of 4126 living in 1082 households. Its main agriculture product is rice growing.

References

Villages in Prakasam district